The title of Hijo Predilecto de Andalucía ("Favorite Son of Andalusia") or in the case of a female recipient Hija Predilecta de Andalucía ("Favorite Daughter of Andalusia") is an honorific title granted annually on August 10 according to decree 156/1983 of the Andalusian Autonomous Government, recognizing exceptional merit or distinction in relation to the Andalusian region, through scientific, social or political actions or works that have redounded to the benefit of Andalusia. It is the highest distinction of the autonomous community of Andalusia.

The nature of the honor 
The honor is granted by agreement of the Governing Council of the Andalusian Autonomous Government, based on names proposed by the President of the Government, passed on by the president's office, the Consejería de la Presidencia. The title is strictly honorific, and does not entail any award of money. The names of those given the title are written in a registry known as the Libro de Oro de Andalucía ("Golden Book of Andalusia"). A medal is awarded with the inscription Hijo Predilecto de Andalucía, along with a silver plaque stating the reason for granting the award in this particular case. Normally at most ten medals are awarded each year, although the Governing Council may make exceptions to that. (In practice, as of 2009 that number has never been reached.) That count does not include awards given as a courtesy or in reciprocity, nor does it include posthumous awards. The honor is awarded in a public and solemn ceremony presided over by the President of the Government, in the presence of the Governing Council, and if possible coinciding with the regional holiday, the Andalusia Day, 28 February. The honor can be revoked if the recipient behaves publicly in a manner counter to the Autonomous Community of Andalusia, the principles of the 1978 Constitution of Spain or the Statute of Autonomy of Andalusia, or prejudicial to the dignity of their basic interests.

List of Hijos Predilectos de Andalucía 
 1983
 Antonio Cruz García ("Antonio Mairena"), singer, Mairena del Alcor, Province of Seville
Rafael Alberti, writer, El Puerto de Santa María, Cádiz
Vicente Aleixandre Merlo, writer, Seville
Jorge Guillén Álvarez, writer, Valladolid
Andrés Segovia, guitarist, Linares, Jaén
Ramón Carande y Thovar, historian and economist, Palencia, autonomous community of Castile-Leon

 1984
Juan Álvarez Ossorio y Barrau, historian, activist

 1985
Rafael Escuredo Rodríguez, lawyer and politician, Estepa, Seville
María Zambrano Alarcón, writer, Vélez-Málaga, Málaga
Antonio Gala Velasco, writer, Brazatortas, Ciudad Real
Carlos Castilla del Pino, psychiatrist, San Roque, Cádiz
Antonio Domínguez Ortiz, historian, Seville

 1987
José Antonio Valverde Gómez, zoologist
Manuel Andújar, escritor, La Carolina, Jaén
Juan de Mata Carriazo

 1988
Emilio García Gómez, historian specializing in Arabism, Madrid
Manuel Castillo Navarro, composer and pianist, Seville
Manuel Rivera Hernández, painter, Granada
Pablo García Baena, poet, Córdoba
José Manuel Rodríguez Delgado, physician and neurophysiologist, Málaga

 1989
Rafael Montesinos Martínez, poet, Seville, Seville
José Muñoz Caballero, painter, Huelva
Luis Rosales Camacho, poet, Granada, Granada

 1990
Javier Benjumea Puigcerver, businessman, founder of Abengoa, Seville
Dolores Jiménez Alcántara "Niña de La Puebla", singer, La Puebla de Cazalla, Seville
Francisco Ayala y García Duarte, writer, Granada, Granada

 1991
José Rodríguez de la Borbolla y Camoyán, lawyer and politician, Seville, Seville

 1992
José Antonio Muñoz Rojas, poet, Antequera, Málaga, Málaga

 1993
Manuel Losada Villasante, scientist, Carmona, Seville

 1994
S.A.R. Doña María de las Mercedes de Borbón y Orleans, mother of the King Juan Carlos, Madrid

 1995
Miguel Rodríguez-Piñero Bravo-Ferrer, jurist, professor, magistrate and president of the Constitutional Court of Spain, Seville, Seville

 1996
José Manuel Caballero Bonald, poet and essayist, Jerez de la Frontera, Cádiz, Cádiz

 1997
No award given.

 1998
Felipe González Márquez, lawyer and politician, Dos Hermanas, Seville, Seville

 1999
Manuel F. Clavero Arévalo, lawyer and politician, Seville, Seville

 2000
Carlos Amigo Vallejo, Archbishop of Seville, Medina de Rioseco, Valladolid

 2001
, songwriter, Granada, Granada. (Posthumous.)
Pedro Cruz Villalón, president of the Constitutional Court of Spain, Seville, Seville

 2002
Manuel Jiménez de Parga, president of the Tribunal Constitucional, Granada, Granada

 2003
Emilio Lledó Íñigo, professor of philosophy, Seville, Seville
Christine Ruiz-Picasso, daughter-in-law of Pablo Picasso, philanthropist, Paris, France

 2004
Francisco Márquez Villanueva, professor of medieval literature, Seville, Seville
Leopoldo de Luis, poet, Córdoba, Córdoba

 2005
María Victoria Atencia García, poet, Málaga, Málaga
Julia Uceda Valiente, poet, literary critic, and professor of literature, Seville, Seville

 2006
María del Rosario Cayetana Fitz-James Stuart y Silva, 18th Duchess of Alba, (Madrid)
Carlos Edmundo de Ory, poet, Cádiz, Cádiz

 2007
José Saramago, writer, Azinhaga, Portugal

 2008
Federico Mayor Zaragoza, former rector of the University of Granada, former director general of UNESCO. Barcelona, autonomous community of Catalonia

 2009
Juan Antonio Carrillo Salcedo, Doctor of Laws at the University of Seville, expert in international law, Morón de la Frontera, Seville

 2013
Antonio Banderas, actor
, syndicalist (posthumous)
Carmen Laffón de la Escosura, painter

2017
Hijos Predilectos
María Galiana
Luis García Montero

2018
José Luis Gómez García
Guillermo Antiñolo Gil

Acceptance speeches 
Most of the recipients of the award come with a prepared acceptance speech. Politician Felipe González broke somewhat with this tradition in 1998 when he gave part of his speech extemporaneously; writer José Saramago in 2007 gave an entirely improvised speech. During his speech his medal fell to the floor and he had to stoop to recover it. He then continued, "This could be resolved with a Latin proverb, Sic transit gloria mundi, which gained him a round of applause.

Notes

External links 

 Hijos Predilectos de Andalucía, official list.
 Decreto 156/1983, the law creating the honor.

Andalusian culture
Spanish awards